Roark Capital Group is an American private equity firm with over $33 billion in assets under management. The firm is focused on leveraged buyout investments in middle-market companies, primarily in the franchise/multi-location, restaurant and food, health and wellness, and business services sectors. It is named for Howard Roark, the protagonist in Ayn Rand's novel The Fountainhead. The firm claims that its name is not meant to connote any particular political philosophy but instead signify the firm's admiration for the iconoclastic qualities of independence and self-assurance embodied by the central figure in The Fountainhead.

History
The firm, which is based in Atlanta, Georgia, was founded in 2001 by the current Managing Partner, Neal K. Aronson.  Senior team members include President Paul D. Ginsberg, Chief Investment Officer Erik O. Morris, and Managing Directors Timothy Armstrong, Stephen D. Aronson, Dennis Gies, Clay Harmon, Geoff Hill, Kevin Hofmann, Ian Picache, Gregory Smith, Sarah Spiegel, Michael Thompson, and David Wierman.

Prior to founding Roark Capital Group in 2001, Aronson was a co-founder of U.S. Franchise Systems in 1995. Roark currently is investing out of its fifth institutional private equity fund.

Investments
Roark's current and former portfolio companies include:

Current investments 

 Anytime Fitness
 Batteries Plus Bulbs
 The Cheesecake Factory
 CKE Restaurants: (Carl's Jr., Hardee's, Green Burrito & Red Burrito)
 Culver's (minority investment)
 Divisions Maintenance Group
 Driven Brands: (1-800-Radiator & A/C, Abra, CARSTAR, International Car Wash Group/ICWG, Maaco, Meineke, Merlin 200,000 Mile Shops, Xpress Lube, Take 5 Oil Change, Pro Oil Change, Econo Lube & Tune)
 Drybar
 Fitness Connection
 Focus Brands: (Auntie Anne's, Carvel, Cinnabon, Jamba, McAlister's Deli, Moe's Southwest Grill, Schlotzsky's,)
 Great Expressions Dental Centers
 Home Service Store
Inspire Brands: (Arby's, Buffalo Wild Wings, Sonic Drive-In, Jimmy John's, Dunkin', Baskin-Robbins)
 Installation Made Easy
 Jim 'N Nick's BBQ Restaurants
 Massage Envy
 Miller's Ale House
 Orangetheory Fitness
 Pet Retail Brands: (Bosley's, Pet Supermarket, PetValu) Petstores
 Primrose Schools
 Self Esteem Brands: (Basecamp Fitness, The Bar Method, Waxing the City)
 Solterra Recycling
 ServiceMaster Brands: (ServiceMaster Clean, ServiceMaster Restore, AmeriSpec, Furniture Medic, Merry Maids)

 Mathnasium
 Aftermath Services

Former investments 
 Atkins Nutritionals
 Cyber Core Technologies
 Fastsigns
 GFL Environmental
 Il Fornaio: (Corner Bakery Cafe)
 Money Mailer
 Movie Gallery
 Naf Naf Grill
 Peachtree Business Products
 PSC Info Group
 Qualawash
 United States Arbitrage Finance II
 USFS
 Waste Pro
 Wingstop

References

External links

Financial services companies established in 2001
Private equity firms of the United States
Companies based in Atlanta
American companies established in 2001
Franchises